Events in the year 1949 in Brazil.

Incumbents

Federal government
 President: Marshal Eurico Gaspar Dutra 
 Vice President: Nereu Ramos

Governors 
 Alagoas: Silvestre Pericles
 Amazonas: Leopoldo da Silva Amorim Neves
 Bahia: Otávio Mangabeira 
 Ceará: Faustino de Albuquerque 
 Espírito Santo: Carlos Fernando Monteiro Lindenberg 
 Goiás: Jerônimo Coimbra Bueno 
 Maranhão: 
 Mato Grosso: Arnaldo Estêvão de Figueiredo
 Minas Gerais: Milton Soares Campos 
 Pará: Luís de Moura Carvalho 
 Paraíba: Osvaldo Trigueiro 
 Paraná: Moisés Lupion 
 Pernambuco: Alexandre Barbosa Lima Sobrinho 
 Piauí: José da Rocha Furtado 
 Rio de Janeiro: Macedo Soares 
 Rio Grande do Norte: José Augusto Varela 
 Rio Grande do Sul: Walter Só Jobim 
 Santa Catarina: Aderbal Ramos da Silva 
 São Paulo: Ademar de Barros 
 Sergipe: Jose Rollemberg

Vice governors
 Ceará: Francisco de Menezes Pimentel 
 Espírito Santo: José Rodrigues Sette 
 Goiás: Hosanah de Campos Guimarães 
 Maranhão: Saturnino Bello
 Minas Gerais: José Ribeiro Pena 
 Paraíba: José Targino Pereira da Costa 
 Piauí: Osvaldo da Costa e Silva 
 Rio Grande do Norte: Tomaz Salustino
 São Paulo: Luís Gonzaga Novelli Júnior

Events
25 January - IEPAC, the forerunner of UniÍtalo, is founded by professor and Italian immigrant Pasquale Cascino.
1 February - The Roman Catholic Diocese of Macapá is established as Territorial Prelature of Macapá from the Territorial Prelature of Santarém.
date unknown - The Centro Brasileiro de Pesquisas Físicas is founded by Cesar Lattes, José Leite Lopes, and Jayme Tiomno.

Arts and culture

Books
Maria José Dupré - Dona Lola

Films
Almas Adversas
Estou Aí
A Escrava Isaura
O Homem que Passa
Inocência
Pinguinho de Gente
Vendaval Maravilhoso

Music
Afoxé music is introduced by a group called Filhos de Gandhi.

Births
27 January - Djavan, singer-songwriter
14 May - Helvécio Ratton, film director, producer and screenwriter
12 August - Fernando Collor de Mello, President of Brazil 1990-1992
21 September - Odilo Scherer, Archbishop of São Paulo

Deaths
2 February - Pedro Paulo Bruno, painter, singer and poet (born 1888) 
11 December - Rudolf Komorek, Salesian missionary (born 1890)

References

See also 
1949 in Brazilian football
List of Brazilian films of 1949

 
1940s in Brazil
Years of the 20th century in Brazil
Brazil
Brazil